Cychropsis korelli is a species of ground beetle in the subfamily of Carabinae. It was described by Klienfeld in 1999.

References

korelli
Beetles described in 1999